Edris a jin was a cross and circle game played in Syria and Lebanon. It has been compared to Pachisi.

References

External links

James Masters: The Online Guide to Traditional Games; Pachisi (Ludo etc.)

Cross and circle games
Syrian culture
Lebanese culture